Courtney Solomon (born September 1,1970) is a writer, director, producer, and entrepreneur from Toronto, Ontario. He has been involved with production, marketing, and distribution of over 80 movies.

Life and career

At 19, he formed Sweetpea Entertainment to acquire the film rights to "Dungeons & Dragons". Dungeons & Dragons became his first production and direction project. It was a box office disappointment 

As owner of Sweetpea Entertainment, Solomon was looking to acquire the media rights to a science-fiction property that could be adapted into a television series or an MMORPG. In 1996, in exchange for the equity position and media rights to Traveller, Sweetpea advanced the money to get Imperium Games started as a company to be dedicated solely to Traveller.

He later formed After Dark Films to produce horror, thriller, and action titles. He launched it with An American Haunting, which he wrote, produced, and directed. It is a story based on Tennessee's Bell Witch legend. It opened #2 in US, staying in the top ten films for 6 weeks. This success resulted in a long-term distribution and co-production arrangement with Lionsgate Films. Today, After Dark owns its own film library of over 80 films.

In 2014, Solomon partnered with Mark Canton on a number of films including Cake. Other films were Mr. Church (Eddie Murphy), The Comedian (Robert DeNiro and Leslie Mann), The Yellow Birds (Tye Sheridan, Alden Ehrenreich, Jack Huston, Jennifer Aniston, and Toni Collette), and Burn Your Maps (Vera Farmiga and Jacob Tremblay).

In 2018, he acquired the rights to and produced the first film based on the novel series After. The film of the same name was released in April 2019. The sequel, After We Collided, was released in 2020. In the same year, he also acquired the rights to the underground comic universe of the Fabulous Furry Freak Brothers created by Gilbert Shelton in 1968.

He also has several films going into production, including Arthur The King starring Mark Wahlberg and Red Sonja, based on the character and comic book by Roy Thomas and Barry Smith.

Filmography

Producer only
 Dungeons & Dragons: Wrath of the Dragon God (2005)
 Captivity (2007)
 Universal Soldier: Regeneration (2009)
 The Butterfly Effect 3: Revelations (2009)
 Slaughter (2009)
 Perkins' 14 (2009)
 Beyond a Reasonable Doubt (2009)
 Prowl (2010)
 The Task (2011)
 Seconds Apart (2011)
 Husk (2011)
 Fertile Ground (2011)
 51 (2011)
 Scream of the Banshee (2011)
 Transit (2012)
 Bullet to the Head (2012)
 Dragon Eyes (2012)
 El Gringo (2012)
 The Philly Kid (2012)
 Universal Soldier: Day of Reckoning (2012)
 Stash House (2012)
 Dark Circles (2013)
 Enemies Closer (2013)
 Ritual (2013)
 Murder in the Dark (2013)
 Cake (2014)
 Re-Kill (2015)
 Bastard (2015)
 The Wicked Within (2015)
 Wind Walkers (2015)
 Mr. Church (2016)
 Burn Your Maps (2016)
 The Comedian (2016)
 The Yellow Birds (2017)
 Nightmare Cinema (2018)
 The Woman in the Window (2021)

References

External links
 

1971 births
Living people
Film producers from Ontario
Canadian male screenwriters
Canadian film executives
Film directors from Toronto
Writers from Toronto
21st-century Canadian screenwriters